Quercus radiata is an endangered species of oak native to Mexico.

Description
Quercus radiata is a small evergreen tree that typically reaches  in height.

Distribution and habitat 
It is native to the southern Sierra Madre Occidental, including southern Durango, eastern Nayarit, western Zacatecas, and northern Jalisco.

Its range is mostly outside protected areas and subject habitat degradation from timber harvesting and encroachment by roads and agriculture.

References

Flora of the Sierra Madre Occidental
Endemic oaks of Mexico
radiata
Taxa named by William Trelease